Sabine Lösing (born 30 November 1955) is a German politician and Member of the European Parliament from Germany. She is a member of The Left, part of the European United Left–Nordic Green Left. In February 2013, she was elected as chairwoman of the Die Linke state association in Lower Saxony.

References

External links

1955 births
Living people
The Left (Germany) MEPs
MEPs for Germany 2009–2014
MEPs for Germany 2014–2019
21st-century women MEPs for Germany